Peter Brock (1945–2006) was an Australian racing car driver.

Peter Brock may also refer to:

 Pete Brock (born 1936), American racing car designer, notably of the Shelby Daytona coupé
 Pete Brock (American football) (born 1954), played for New England Patriots from 1976 to 1987
 Peter Brock (historian) (1920–2006), Canadian historian of pacifism
 Peter Felix Brock (1805–1875), imperial Russian statesman of Prussian descent, Minister of Finance of the Russian Empire (1852–58)